Kuklen is a town in southern Bulgaria, part of Plovdiv Province. It is located 7 km to the south of the nearest major city, Plovdiv, and is approximately 140 km south east of the Bulgarian capital, Sofia. Kuklen was proclaimed a town on 23 May 2006 and  had a population of 6,877. It is the center of Kuklen Municipality.

Kuklen is notable for having, despite its low population, not only a majority Bulgarian Orthodox population with several Orthodox churches, but also Muslim residents and a mosque, as well as a Greek Catholic community and a Catholic place of worship, with all three religious communities living on good terms with each other.

Geography
Kuklen is located in the plains of the Rhodopes, 7 km. east of Plovdiv.

Population
The number of permanent residents in Kuklen is 6,881, and 6,000 more are temporary.

As of February 2011, Kuklen has 5,858 residents.

History

Honor
Kuklen Point on Livingston Island, South Shetland Islands is named after Kuklen.

References

Towns in Bulgaria
Populated places in Plovdiv Province